PA22 may refer to:
 Payen PA-22, a French experimental aircraft
 Pennsylvania Route 22 (1920s)
 Pennsylvania's 22nd congressional district
 Piper PA-22 Tri-Pacer, an American light aircraft
 U.S. Route 22 in Pennsylvania